Rauma Ice Pack is a Finnish rugby club in Rauma.

External links
Rauma Ice Pack

Finnish rugby union teams
Rauma, Finland